Arthur Murray Blythe (May 7, 1940 – March 27, 2017) was an American jazz alto saxophonist and composer. He was described by critic Chris Kelsey as displaying "one of the most easily recognizable alto sax sounds in jazz, big and round, with a fast, wide vibrato and an aggressive, precise manner of phrasing" and furthermore as straddling the avant garde and traditionalist jazz, often with bands featuring unusual instrumentation.

Biography 

Born in Los Angeles, Blythe lived in San Diego, returning to Los Angeles when he was 19 years old. He took up the alto saxophone at the age of nine, playing R&B until his mid-teens when he discovered jazz. In the mid-1960s, Blythe was part of the Underground Musicians and Artists Association (UGMAA), founded by Horace Tapscott, on whose 1969 The Giant Is Awakened he made his recording debut.

After moving to New York in the mid-1970s, Blythe worked as a security guard before being offered a place as sideman for Chico Hamilton (1975–77). He subsequently played with Gil Evans' Orchestra (1976–78), Lester Bowie (1978), Jack DeJohnette (1979) and McCoy Tyner (also 1979). Blythe's group – John Hicks, Fred Hopkins and Steve McCall – played Carnegie Hall and the Village Vanguard in 1979.

In 1977, Blythe appeared on the LP Rhythmatism, a recording led by drummer Steve Reid. Reviewing in Christgau's Record Guide: Rock Albums of the Seventies (1981), Robert Christgau highlighted Blythe's "forceful" alto-saxophone playing and said, "like so many of the new players Blythe isn't limited to modern methods by his modernism—he favors fluent, straight-ahead Coltrane modalities, but also demonstrates why he belongs on a tune for Cannonball."

Blythe began to record as a leader in 1977 for the India Navigation label and then for Columbia Records from 1978 to 1987. Bob Stewart's tuba was a regular feature of these albums, often taking the place of the more traditional string bass. Albums such as The Grip and Metamorphosis (both on the label) demonstrated Blythe's maturity as well as his ability to play in both free and traditional contexts with a fully-developed personal style. Blythe played on many pivotal albums of the 1980s, among them Jack DeJohnette's Special Edition on ECM. Blythe was a member of the all-star jazz group The Leaders and joined the World Saxophone Quartet after the departure of Julius Hemphill. Beginning in 2000 he made recordings on Savant Records which included Exhale (2003) with John Hicks (piano), Bob Stewart (tuba), and Cecil Brooks III (drums).

Blythe died from complications of Parkinson's disease in Lancaster, California, at the age of 76.

Discography

As leader

Collaborations
With Synthesis
Six by Six (Chiaroscuro, 1977), with Olu Dara, a.o.
Sentiments (Ra, 1979), with Olu Dara, David Murray, a.o.
With The Leaders
Mudfoot (Black Hawk, 1986)
Out Here Like This (Black Saint, 1987)
Unforeseen Blessings (Black Saint, 1988)
Slipping and Sliding (Sound Hills, 1994)
With Roots
Salutes the Saxophone – Tributes to John Coltrane, Dexter Gordon, Sonny Rollins and Lester Young (In & Out, 1992)
Stablemates (In & Out, 1993)
Say Something (In & Out, 1995)
With Santi Debriano and Billy Hart
3-Ology (Konnex, 1993)
With Jeff Palmer, John Abercrombie, Victor Lewis
Ease On (AudioQuest Music, 1993)
With David Eyges and Bruce Ditmas
Synergy (In & Out, 1997)
With John Abercrombie, Terri Lyne Carrington, Anthony Cox, Mark Feldman, Gust Tsilis
Echoes (Alessa, 2005)

As sideman
With Joey Baron
Down Home (Intuition, 1997) with Ron Carter and Bill Frisell
We'll Soon Find Out (Intuition, 1999) with Ron Carter and Bill Frisell
With Lester Bowie
The 5th Power (Black Saint, 1978)
African Children (Horo, 1978)
With Jack DeJohnette
Special Edition (ECM, 1979)
With Gil Evans
Gil Evans Live at the Royal Festival Hall London 1978 (RCA, 1979)
The Rest of Gil Evans Live at the Royal Festival Hall London 1978 (Mole Jazz, 1981)
Parabola (Horo, 1979)
Live at the Public Theater, Vol. 1 & 2 (Trio (Japan)/Storyville (Sweden), 1980)
Priestess (Antilles, 1983)
Sting and Gil Evans – Strange Fruit (ITM, 1993), three tracks with Blythe rec. 1976 without Sting
With John Fischer
6 × 1 = 10 Duos for a New Decade (Circle, 1980)

With Chico Freeman
Luminous (Jazz House, 1989)
Focus (Contemporary, 1995)
With Chico Hamilton
Peregrinations (Blue Note, 1975)
Chico Hamilton and the Players (Blue Note, 1976)
With Craig Harris
Cold Sweat Plays J. B. (JMT, 1999)
With Julius Hemphill
Coon Bid'ness (Freedom, 1972)
With Azar Lawrence
Bridge into the New Age (Prestige, 1974)
With the Music Revelation Ensemble
In the Name of... (DIW, 1994)
Knights of Power (DIW, 1996)
With Woody Shaw
The Iron Men with Anthony Braxton (Muse, 1977 [1980]) 
With Horace Tapscott
The Giant is Awakened (Flying Dutchman, 1969)
With Gust William Tsilis & Alithea
Pale Fire (Enja, 1988)
With McCoy Tyner 
Quartets 4 X 4 (Milestone, 1980)
44th Street Suite (Red Baron,1991)
With the World Saxophone Quartet
Metamorphosis (Elektra Nonesuch, 1990)
Breath of Life (Elektra Nonesuch, 1992)

References

External links 

All About Jazz: A Fireside Chat With Arthur Blythe

1940 births
2017 deaths
Avant-garde jazz musicians
African-American jazz musicians
Jazz alto saxophonists
American jazz saxophonists
American male saxophonists
Jazz musicians from California
Musicians from Los Angeles
Columbia Records artists
Enja Records artists
India Navigation artists
HighNote Records artists
Alessa Records artists
CIMP artists
World Saxophone Quartet members
American male jazz musicians
The Leaders members
20th-century African-American people
21st-century African-American people
20th-century American saxophonists